Melica subulata is a species of grass known by the common name Alaska oniongrass.

Distribution
It is native to western North America from Alaska to California to Colorado, where it grows in moist habitat, often in forests.

Melica subulata is a main understory member of the Douglas-fir/Alaska oniongrass plant community, a rare plant association that occurs on the southern edge of Vancouver Island on the Strait of Georgia. This plant community once had a wider range, occurring also along the Puget Sound and in the Willamette Valley.

Description
Melica subulata is a rhizomatous perennial grass with clustered onionlike corms at the base of each stem. It grows to a maximum height near 1.3 meters. The inflorescence is a narrow or spreading panicle of cylindrical, pointed spikelets which may be nearly 3 centimeters long.

References

External links
Jepson Manual Treatment - Melica subulata
Grass Manual Treatment
Melica subulata - Photo gallery

subulata
Grasses of the United States
Grasses of Canada
Native grasses of California
Flora of the Northwestern United States
Flora of Alaska
Flora of British Columbia
Flora of Colorado
Flora of Nevada
Flora of the Cascade Range
Flora of the Rocky Mountains
Flora of the Sierra Nevada (United States)
Natural history of the California Coast Ranges
Flora without expected TNC conservation status